John Palmer Usher (January 9, 1816 – April 13, 1889) was an American administrator who served in the Cabinet of President Abraham Lincoln during the American Civil War.

Life and career
Born in Brookfield, New York, Usher trekked west in 1839 to locate in Terre Haute in western Indiana where he became a law partner with William D. Griswold in the firm of Griswold & Usher. An outstanding trial lawyer, Usher traveled the circuit in Indiana and Illinois during the 1840s and 1850s, becoming acquainted with Abraham Lincoln of Springfield, Illinois. He also became a mentor to young Joseph Gurney Cannon.

In 1850, Usher was elected to serve in the Indiana General Assembly. After the resignation of James G. Jones, Governor Oliver P. Morton appointed Usher to the office of Indiana Attorney General. While Usher was serving as Attorney General in March 1862, Lincoln asked him to serve as Assistant Secretary of the Interior. Then-secretary Caleb Blood Smith had little interest in the job, and, with declining health, soon delegated most of his responsibilities to Usher. When Smith resigned in December 1862, Usher became Secretary effective January 1, 1863.

Usher served as the Secretary of the Interior between 1863 and 1865.  He was known as genial, courteous, and unobtrusive secretary. He accompanied Lincoln to Gettysburg, Pennsylvania in November 1863 for the dedication of the Gettysburg National Cemetery and sat on the platform with other dignitaries when Lincoln gave his famous Gettysburg Address.  When William P. Fessenden resigned as Secretary of the Treasury in March 1865, Lincoln nominated Hugh McCulloch from Indiana to replace Fessenden at Treasury.  Lincoln did not want two men from Indiana in his cabinet.  Usher dated his resignation March 8, 1865 with an effective date of May 15.  His resignation was accepted by Lincoln on March 9 and Usher continued to serve until May 15, a month after Lincoln's assassination.  Lincoln had nominated his close friend James Harlan to replace Usher.  Harlan had been confirmed by the Senate and took over as Secretary of Interior under now President Andrew Johnson.

Usher became general solicitor for the Union Pacific Railway, Eastern Division, and was active in promoting the building of the railroad west from Kansas City.  Later called the Kansas Pacific, the road was eventually consolidated with the Union Pacific in 1880.

Usher built a house in Lawrence, Kansas, completing it in 1873.  Usher served one term as mayor of Lawrence.  His house still stands at 1425 Tennessee Street and is on the National Register of Historic Places. It has been the home of the Alpha Nu chapter of Beta Theta Pi fraternity at the University of Kansas since 1912.

Usher died of cancer at the age of 73.  He is buried in Oak Hill Cemetery in Lawrence.

Portrayal

Usher is portrayed by Dakin Matthews in Steven Spielberg's Lincoln.

References

External links 

Mr. Lincoln's White House: John Palmer Usher Biography
 The Department of Everything Else: Highlights of Interior History (1989)

1816 births
1889 deaths
19th-century American lawyers
United States Secretaries of the Interior
Indiana Attorneys General
Indiana lawyers
Union (American Civil War) political leaders
People of Indiana in the American Civil War
Deaths from cancer in Pennsylvania
Indiana Republicans
Lincoln administration cabinet members
Andrew Johnson administration cabinet members
19th-century American politicians
Mayors of places in Kansas
Kansas Republicans
People from Brookfield, New York